Lovelorn may refer to:

 Lovelorn (album), an album by Leaves' Eyes
 Lovelorn (film), a Turkish film
 The Lovelorn, a 1927 American silent film